Tony Graham (born 26 March 1962) is a New Zealand former cyclist. He competed in the 1 km time trial event at the 1988 Summer Olympics.

References

External links
 

1962 births
Living people
New Zealand male cyclists
Olympic cyclists of New Zealand
Cyclists at the 1988 Summer Olympics
Sportspeople from Gisborne, New Zealand